In geometry, the gyroelongated bicupolae are an infinite sets of polyhedra, constructed by adjoining two n-gonal cupolas to an n-gonal Antiprism. The triangular, square, and pentagonal gyroelongated bicupola are three of five Johnson solids which are chiral, meaning that they have a "left-handed" and a "right-handed" form.

Adjoining two triangular prisms to a cube also generates a polyhedron, but has adjacent parallel faces, so is not a Johnson solid. The hexagonal form is also a polygon, but has coplanar faces. Higher forms can be constructed without regular faces.

See also
 Elongated cupola

References
Norman W. Johnson, "Convex Solids with Regular Faces", Canadian Journal of Mathematics, 18, 1966, pages 169–200. Contains the original enumeration of the 92 solids and the conjecture that there are no others.
  The first proof that there are only 92 Johnson solids.

Polyhedra